To Let is a 2017 Indian Tamil-language drama film written, directed and filmed by Chezhiyan. Produced by his wife Prema, the film stars Santhosh Sreeram, Suseela and Dharun as a family living in a rented house who are ordered by their landlady (Aadhira Pandilakshmi) to vacate.

At the 65th National Film Awards, it won in the category Best Feature Film in Tamil. At the 49th International film festival of India, Goa it won Special jury mention award in international competition. The film theatrically released on 21 February 2019 to highly positive reviews from critics, and became a success in box office.

Plot 
Illango is an assistant film director living with his wife Amudha and their five-year-old son Siddharth in a rented apartment. Their landlady is eager to lease that house to IT professionals for a higher rent, so she issues the family a 30-day notice to vacate.

Cast 

  Santhosh Sreeram  as Illango
 Sheela Rajkumar as Amudha
 Dharun as Siddharth
 Aadhira Pandilakshmi as the landowner

Production 
To Let is the directorial debut of Chezhiyan, and was produced by his wife Prema under the couple's own company La Cinema. Chezhiyan also handled the cinematography and wrote the script. Unlike in most Tamil films, he avoided including songs, claiming, "As we move closely towards realistic cinema, the first element that make an exit is the music. The sound of radio and television, the conversation of people and an auto on the road compensate for the music".

The film was completed in 25 days, and the cast were all newcomers.

Release and reception 
To Let was screened at numerous film festivals in 2017 and 2018, and was theatrically released on 21 February 2019.

At the 65th National Film Awards, it won in the category Best Feature Film in Tamil. It won the Best Indian film award in the Kolkata International film festival Indian films competition in November 2017. It participated in Indian language competition in Bengaluru International film festival and won the FIPRESCI award 2018. It was selected in IFFI Goa 2018 in three major categories - International Competition, Centenary Award for the Best Debut Feature Film of a Director and Indian Panorama.

References

External links 
 

2010s Tamil-language films
2017 directorial debut films
2017 drama films
2017 films
Best Tamil Feature Film National Film Award winners
Indian drama films